Keane Live is English alternative rock band Keane's fourth DVD, second proper. It was recorded at London's O2 Arena during the band's Under the Iron Sea Tour and released on 19 November 2007.

Contents

Live Concert
"The Iron Sea"
"Everybody’s Changing"
"Put It Behind You"
"Nothing in My Way"
"We Might As Well Be Strangers"
"Bend and Break"
"Can't Stop Now" (upbeaten)
"Try Again" (Chaplin on distortion piano)
"Your Eyes Open" (acoustic, Chaplin on guitar)
"The Frog Prince" (semi-acoustic, Chaplin on guitar)
"Hamburg Song"
"Fly To Me" (prelude)
"Leaving So Soon?"
"This Is the Last Time"
"A Bad Dream" (Chaplin on piano)
"Somewhere Only We Know"
"Is It Any Wonder?"
"Broken Toy" (Chaplin on guitar solo, acoustic)
"Atlantic"
"Crystal Ball"
"Bedshaped" (extended)

Short Film 
The build-up to the show

Soundcheck
"Is It Any Wonder?"

Live Visuals
"A Bad Dream"
"Is It Any Wonder?"
"Atlantic"

Band members 
Tom Chaplin - lead vocals, acoustic guitar, distortion CP60
Tim Rice-Oxley - piano, keyboards, programming, backing vocals, distortion CP70
Richard Hughes - drums, backing vocals

Keane (band) video albums
2007 video albums